Kappa Trianguli Australis (κ Trianguli Australis) is a star in the constellation Triangulum Australe.

Kappa Trianguli Australis is a yellow G-type supergiant with an apparent magnitude of +5.08.  It is around 1,200 light years from Earth.

It is not generally listed as a variable star but Hipparcos photometry showed small amplitude brightness changes. The dominant period was around 600 days and the amplitude less than a hundredth of a magnitude.

References

G-type supergiants
Trianguli Australis, Kappa
Triangulum Australe
141767
077982
5891
Durchmusterung objects
Semiregular variable stars